Matviychuk or Matveichuk is a gender-neutral Ukrainian surname that may refer to
Eduard Matviychuk (born 1963), Ukrainian regional administrator
Semyon Matviychuk (born 1998), Russian football player 
Vasyl Matviychuk (born 1982), Ukrainian long-distance runner
Volodymyr Matviychuk (born 1982), Ukrainian boxer

See also
 

Ukrainian-language surnames
Patronymic surnames